Les Garrigues is a comarca (county) in Catalonia, Spain. Its capital is Les Borges Blanques. Its symbol (on the flag and shield in the right panel) is an olive branch, Les Garrigues being the center of olive cultivation (most of it without the necessity of irrigation) in all of Catalonia.

History
The cave paintings at Roca dels Moros, El Cogul, are the most important vestiges of prehistoric settlement in Les Garrigues. A Neolithic tomb has been found at Les Borges Blanques. During the Iberian era, the comarca was settled by the Ilergetians. There is documentation also for Roman summer residences and country villas,  particularly in the north, but the Roman influence died out soon after.

Municipalities

References

External links

Official comarcal Web site (in Catalan)
IDESCAT: statistical information about Garrigues (in Catalan)
Information about Garrigues on the site of the Generalitat de Catalunya (in Catalan)
Detailed map of the comarca (text in  Catalan)

 
Comarques of the Province of Lleida